Herman II, Count of Weimar-Orlamünde ( – 27 December 1247) was a member of the House of Ascania.  He ruled the County of Weimar-Orlamünde from 1206 until his death.

Life 
He was the youngest son of Count Siegfried III ( – 1206) and his wife Sophie (1159 – ), a daughter of King Valdemar I of Denmark.

After his father died in 1206, Hermann II ruled Weimar-Orlamünde jointly with his brother Albert II.  He came increasingly into conflict with Landgrave Herman I of Thuringia, who occupied Schauenforst Castle between Orlamünde and Rudolstadt.  In 1214, Herman of Thuringia took Herman of Weimar-Orlamünde prisoner at Weimar Castle.  Landgrave Louis IV of Thuringia also fought against the brothers Herman and Albert.  Despite the continuing troubles with Thuringia, Herman II managed to expand his territorial sovereignty.  He founded the city of Weimar and a Cistercian monastery at Oberweimar.  In the conflict between the Houses of Guelph and Hohenstaufen, he sided with the Hohenstaufen.  His never-ending feuds eventually caused the downfall of his dynasty.  The areas around the two main towns remained separate territories and so it was logical that around 1265 his sons Herman III and Otto III divided the county into two almost independent counties of Weimar and Orlamünde.

Marriage and issue 
Herman II married Princess Beatrix of Andechs-Merania, the daughter of Duke Otto I of Merania.  She was the heir to the Lordship of Plassenburg, including Kulmbach and Mittleberg, and to the Lordship of Berneck, including Goldkronach, meinau, Wirsberg, Pretzendorf, Zwernitz Castle and Trebgast.  Herman II and Beatrix had the following children:
 Herman "the Elder", was a clergyman
 Herman III, inherited Orlamünde
 Otto III "the Magnificent" ( – 13 May 1285), married Agnes of Leiningen ( – ), inherited Weimar, Rudolstadt and Plassenburg
 Sophie, married in 1259 to Count Henry VIII of Weida ( – 17 September 1280)
 Otto "the Younger", canon at Würzburg from 1265 to 1308

References

Sources

Further reading 
 Helmut Assing: Die frühen Askanier und ihre Frauen, Kulturstiftung, Bernburg, 2002, p. 22
 Hans Patze and Walter Schlesinger: Geschichte Thüringens, Böhlau Verlag, Cologne and Graz, 1967, p. 157
 Andreas Thiele: Erzählende genealogische Stammtafeln zur europäischen Geschichte, vol. I, part 1, R. G. Fischer Verlag, Frankfurt am Main, 1993, table 168
 Eduard Winkelmann: Kaiser Friedrich II, vol. 1, Wissenschaftliche Buchgesellschaft, Darmstadt, 1963, pp. 379, 480, 481 and 508
 Eduard Winkelmann: ''Kaiser Friedrich II', vol. 2, Wissenschaftliche Buchgesellschaft, Darmstadt 1963, p. 221

External links 
 Entry at genealogie-mittelalter.de
 Entry for Beatrix of Andechs-Merania in  genealogy database by Herbert Stoyan
 
 

House of Ascania
Counts of Weimar-Orlamünde
12th-century births
Year of birth uncertain
1247 deaths